Perth Glory Under-23s is the youth system of Perth Glory Football Club based in Perth, Western Australia, Australia. The academy teams play in the Y-League and National Premier Leagues (U20, U18, U15).

Perth Glory Youth is the highest level squad within the setup. They play in the National Premier Leagues and play the majority of their home games at Hartfield Park (known for sponsorship reasons as Crazy Domains Stadium) in Forrestfield.

Youth team history
Perth Glory first entered a youth team in the 2002 Soccer West Coast Premier League as Future Glory. The team coached by Frank Arok finished seventh out of 12 teams in the league. They lost 2–1 to ECU Joondalup in the State Challenge Cup Final. The club withdrew the youth team ahead of the 2003 season, citing the uncertain future of the National Soccer League.

To be eligible to play in the first team, players must be between the age of 15 and 24. Two overage players are allowed for A-League players who are returning from injury or players trialling with the A-League team.

Youth current squad

Under-23s team history
The team was founded in 2008, as a Perth Glory representative team for the inaugural season of the National Youth League competition. On 25 September 2013, it was confirmed that the team would compete in the National Premier Leagues Western Australia competition for the 2014 season onwards.

Under-23s current squad

Honours
Youth
 State Challenge Cup
Runners-up (1): 2002

 National Premier Leagues Western Australia Premiership
Runners-up (1): 2018

 National Premier Leagues Western Australia Championship
Runners-up (1): 2018

Under-23s
 Y-League Premiership
Runners-up (1): 2009–10
 Y-League Championship
Runners-up (1): 2009–10

Academy
 National Premier Leagues Western Australia U-20 Premiership
Premiers (2): 2015, 2019

 National Premier Leagues Western Australia U-20 Championship
Champions (1): 2019

 National Premier Leagues Western Australia U-18 Premiership
Premiers (2): 2018, 2019
Runners-up (1): 2016

 National Premier Leagues Western Australia U-18 Championship
Champions (1): 2016
Runners-up (1): 2018

References

External links
 Official website

Perth Glory FC
National Premier Leagues clubs
Association football clubs established in 2008
2008 establishments in Australia
Soccer clubs in Perth, Western Australia
A-League National Youth League